Isla Verde can refer to:
Isla Verde, Puerto Rico
Isla Verde International Airport, unofficial name of Luis Muñoz Marín International Airport
Verde Island, Batangas, Philippines
Isla Verde Passage, the strait near this island
La Palma, Canary Islands, Spain, which is nicknamed Isla Verde